Patricia Elizabeth Pincay Gorozabel (born 24 December 1978) is an Ecuadorian former footballer who played as a goalkeeper. She has been a member of the Ecuador women's national team.

International career
Pincay capped for Ecuador at senior level during two Copa América Femenina editions (2003 and 2006).

References

External links

1978 births
Living people
Women's association football goalkeepers
Ecuadorian women's footballers
People from Manabí Province
Ecuador women's international footballers
21st-century Ecuadorian women